Tolhuin is a town in the province of Tierra del Fuego, Argentina. It is located on the eastern shore of Lake Fagnano, in the southern part of the Isla Grande de Tierra del Fuego. It is the third largest settlement on the Argentine side of Tierra del Fuego after Ushuaia and Río Grande.

Tolhuin was founded on October 9, 1972. The word means "like a heart" in Selk'nam language. It lies on National Route 3, and is the only town between the cities of Ushuaia (about 103 kilometres to the south) and Río Grande (about 133 kilometres to the north) on this motorway.

Attractions
There is a bakery called Panadería La Unión located near the town that has become famous on the region. Most buses going to Ushuaia stop here so their passengers can have a coffee, and eat baked goods. The walls are lined with autographed photographs of Argentine celebrities who have visited the town over the decades.

Top Gear incident  
In 2014, Tolhuin was the site of an attack on the film crew from the BBC TV program Top Gear. The crew was confronted by what the presenters called "a mob", who blocked off the road access and began to pelt their cars with stones in a protest over a car plate that referenced the Falklands War. Following the attack, the crew abandoned the damaged vehicles at a police checkpoint and left the country.

Climate

Tolhuin has a tundra climate (ET) that borders closely on a subpolar oceanic climate (Cfc) and subantarctic continental climate (Dfc).

References

 
 WelcomeArgentina

Populated places in Tierra del Fuego Province, Argentina
Cities and towns in Tierra del Fuego
Populated places established in 1972
Populated lakeshore places in Argentina
Cities in Argentina
Tierra del Fuego Province, Argentina
Argentina